Julius Sarisalmi, professionally known as Juju, is a Finnish rapper. To date, he has released four solo albums, the latest of which in June 2014. Juju has also appeared as a featured guest on songs by such artists as Julma-Henri, Teflon Brothers and Aste.

Selected discography

Solo albums

Singles

References

Living people
Finnish rappers
Finnish hip hop musicians
Year of birth missing (living people)